Zydus Hospitals, Ahmedabad Unit is a 550-bed Super multi-specialty regional hospital chain in Ahmedabad, Gujarat. 

Its accredited with all the NABH certifications available in the country including Radiology , Emergency Services, Nursing Excellence, Blood Bank  . The laboratory is also  accredited by NABL . It is also the 18th hospital in India to receive the award of global green-OT.   

Since 2019 , Zydus Hospitals has been awarded ‘The Best Hospital in Ahmedabad ‘ by the extensively researched The WEEK - Marg Survey, four years in a row including 2022. 

With 180 ICU  beds and 45 bed Dialysis Centre Zydus Hospitals, Ahmedabad is spread over an estimated area of 7,50,000 square feet 

With the 3 Tesla silent MRI , 256 slice CT Scan , Da Vinci Xi Robot and 120 Holmium Watt laser amongst others Zydus Hospitals is one of the most advanced hospitals in terms of medical equipment’s.

The hospital is to invest Rs. 1,000 Crore in the state of Gujarat, one of the largest healthcare investments in India. 

Other units of the chain being Zydus Hospitals at Anand & the newly opened unit at Baroda. Zydus group has a unit in Sitapur as a JV with Suzuki 

They are soon coming with high end 300 and 400 bed  hospitals in Rajkot and Surat .

Acquisition 
Zydus Hospitals & Healthcare Private Limited is a standalone project & a separate entity from Cadila Healthcare, It has acquired the Ahmedabad unit of Columbia Asia Hospital Pvt Ltd. Financial details of the transaction were not disclosed, however the speculated amount is about 100 crores.

References

Hospitals in Gujarat
Year of establishment missing